The Academy Award for Best Original Score is an award presented annually by the Academy of Motion Picture Arts and Sciences (AMPAS) to the best substantial body of music in the form of dramatic underscoring written specifically for the film by the submitting composer. Some pre-existing music is allowed, though, but a contending film must include a minimum of original music. This minimum since 2021 is established in 35% of the music, which is raised to 80% for sequels and franchise films. Fifteen scores are shortlisted before nominations are announced.

History
The Academy began awarding movies for their scores in 1935. The category was originally called Best Scoring. At the time, winners and nominees were a mix of original scores and adaptations of pre-existing material. Following the controversial win of Charles Previn for One Hundred Men and a Girl in 1938, a film without a credited composer that featured pre-existing classical music, the Academy added a Best Original Score category in 1939. In 1942, the distinction between the two Scoring categories changed slightly as they were renamed to Best Music Score of a Dramatic Picture and Best Scoring of a Musical Picture. This marked the first time the category was split into separate genres, a distinction that technically still lasts today, although there haven't been enough submissions for the musical category to be activated since 1985. From 1942 to 1985, musical scores had their own category, with the exception of 1958, 1981, and 1982. During that time, both categories had many name changes:

1. Non-musical scores
 Best Music Score of a Dramatic Picture (1942)
 Best Music Score of a Dramatic or Comedy Picture (1943–1962)
 Best Music Score—substantially original (1963–1966)
 Best Original Music Score (1967–1968)
 Best Original Score—for a motion picture [not a musical] (1969–1970)
 Best Original Score (1971, 1976–1995, 2000-today)
 Best Original Dramatic Score (1972–1975, 1996–1999)

2. Musical scores
 Best Scoring of a Musical Picture (1942–1962)
 Best Scoring of Music—adaptation or treatment (1963–1968)
 Best Score of a Musical Picture—original or adaptation (1969–1970)
 Best Original Song Score (1971)
 Best Scoring: Adaptation and Original Song Score (1972–1973)
 Best Scoring: Original Song Score and Adaptation -or- Scoring: Adaptation (1974–1976)
 Best Original Song Score and Its Adaptation or Adaptation Score (1977–1978)
 Best Adaptation Score (1979)
 Best Original Song Score and Its Adaptation -or- Adaptation Score (1980, 1983)
 Best Original Song Score or Adaptation Score (1984)
 Best Original Song Score (1985)
 Best Original Musical or Comedy Score (1996–1999)

Following the wins of four Walt Disney Feature Animation films in six years from 1990 to 1995 (The Little Mermaid, Beauty and the Beast, Aladdin, and The Lion King) during a period called the Disney Renaissance, it was decided to once again split the Best Original Score category by genres, this time by combining comedies and musicals together. As Alan Bergman, the chairman of the Academy's music branch said, "People were voting for the songs, not the underscores. We felt that Academy members outside the music branch didn't distinguish between the two. So when a score like The Lion King is competing against a drama like Forrest Gump, it's apples and oranges – not in the quality of the score, but in the way it functions in the movie. There's a big difference." The category was therefore split into Best Original Dramatic Score and Best Original Musical or Comedy Score in 1996. This change proved unpopular in the other branches of the Academy as Charles Bernstein, chairman of the Academy's rules committee, noted that "no other Oscar category depended on a film's genre" and "the job of composing an underscore for a romantic comedy is not substantially different from working on a heavy drama." This split was reverted in 2000.

In 2020, rules were changed to require that a film's score include a minimum of 60% original music. Franchise films and sequels must include a minimum of 80% new music. In 2021, the rules were changed again, lowering the minimum percentage of original music from 60% to 35% of the total music in the film.

Academy Award for Best Original Musical
The Academy Award for Best Original Musical is a category that was re-established in 2000 after the Best Original Musical or Comedy Score category was retired. It has never been awarded in its present form due to a prolonged drought of films meeting the sufficient eligibility requirements. The Music Branch Executive Committee of the Academy decides whether there are enough quality submissions to justify its activation.

According to the rules, the Best Original Musical is defined as follows:

Winners and nominees
The following is the list of nominated composers organized by year, and listing both films and composers. The years shown in the following list of winners are the production years, thus a reference to 1967 means the Oscars presented in 1968 for films released in 1967.

1930s

1940s

1950s

1960s

1970s

1980s

1990s

2000s

2010s

2020s

Notes

Records

Superlatives 
These are only for nominations in the Scoring categories. Nominations in other categories, such as the Original Song category, are not included.

Only one composer has won two Scoring Oscars the same year: in 1973, Marvin Hamlisch won Original Dramatic Score for The Way We Were and Best Adaptation Score, for The Sting. Hamlisch also won Best Song that year for The Way We Were, making him the only composer to win three music Oscars in the same year.

Only one composer has won Oscars three years in a row: Roger Edens won for Easter Parade (1948), On the Town (1949) and Annie Get Your Gun (1950).

Eight composers have won Oscars two years in a row:

 Ray Heindorf won for Yankee Doodle Dandy (1942) and This Is the Army (1943).
 Franz Waxman won for Sunset Boulevard (1950) and A Place in the Sun (1951).
 Alfred Newman won for With a Song in My Heart (1952) and Call Me Madam (1953). He won again two years in a row for Love Is a Many-Splendored Thing (1955) and The King and I (1956).
 Adolph Deutsch won for Seven Brides for Seven Brothers (1954) and Oklahoma! (1955).
 André Previn won for Gigi (1958) and Porgy and Bess (1959). He won again two years in a row for Irma la Douce (1963) and My Fair Lady (1964).
 Leonard Rosenman won for Barry Lyndon (1975) and Bound for Glory (1976).
 Alan Menken won for Beauty and The Beast (1991) and Aladdin (1992).
 Gustavo Santaolalla won for Brokeback Mountain (2005) and Babel (2006).

Female nominees 
As of 2022, only ten women have been nominated in music score categories: Ann Ronell, Tylwyth Kymry aka Meg Karlin, Angela Morley, Marilyn Bergman, Rachel Portman, Anne Dudley, Lynn Ahrens, Mica Levi, Hildur Guðnadóttir, and Germaine Franco. Kymry, Bergman, and Ahrens were nominated for their contribution as lyricists.

Four women have won in the scoring categories. Three are composers: Rachel Portman, who won for Emma (1996); Anne Dudley, who won for The Full Monty (1997); and Hildur Guðnadóttir, who won for Joker (2019). The fourth is lyricist Marilyn Bergman, who won for Yentl (1983) in the Original Song Score category, sharing the award with co-lyricist Alan Bergman (her husband) and composer Michel Legrand. Guðnadóttir is the only woman to win the award under no qualifications; Bergman won for Best Song Score while Portman and Dudley won for Best Musical or Comedy Score.

The female composers nominated for multiple Scoring Oscars are Rachel Portman, who was nominated for Emma (1996) (for which she won for Best Musical or Comedy Score), The Cider House Rules (1999), and Chocolat (2000); and Angela Morley, who was nominated twice in the Original Song Score or Adaptation Score category for The Little Prince (1974) and The Slipper and the Rose (1976).

Notable nominees 
Dmitri Shostakovich and Duke Ellington were both nominated the same year but lost to the arrangers of West Side Story.

The scores of Midnight Express by Giorgio Moroder in 1979, Slumdog Millionaire by A. R. Rahman in 2009, and The Social Network by Trent Reznor and Atticus Ross in 2011 are the only scores with electronic-based music ever to win the award. In addition, the electronic-based scores of Witness by Maurice Jarre in 1986, Rain Man by Hans Zimmer in 1989, and Her by William Butler, and Owen Pallett in 2014 have also been nominated.

Noted nominated composers known for their music mostly outside the film world include: Aaron Copland, Kurt Weill, Gian-Carlo Menotti, Philip Glass, John Corigliano, Peter Maxwell Davies, Randy Newman, Richard Rodney Bennett, Stephen Schwartz, Andrew Lloyd Webber, Artie Shaw, Trent Reznor, Quincy Jones, Herbie Hancock, Jon Batiste, and Jonny Greenwood.

Rock musicians and pop stars are most often nominated in the songwriting category. A handful that were nominated in the Scoring categories includes: The Beatles, Prince, Pete Townshend, Rod McKuen, Isaac Hayes, Kris Kristofferson, Quincy Jones, Randy Newman, Anthony Newley, Paul Williams, Tom Waits, David Byrne, Ryuichi Sakamoto, Trent Reznor, and Matthew Wilder.

Record producers George Martin (The Beatles) and Jerry Wexler (Atlantic Records) also received nominations in the Scoring categories.

At the age of 87, Ennio Morricone became the oldest winner in Oscar history at the time for a competitive award.

Multiple nominations 
The following is a list of composers nominated more than once and winning at least one Academy Award (in this category). This list is sorted by number of awards, with the number of total nominations listed in parentheses. These do not include nominations (or awards) in the Best Original Song category.

 9: Alfred Newman (43)
 5: John Williams (48)  Also received 5 nominations for Best Original Song, which brings his total to 53 - the most nominated person in all of the music categories combined, and the most nominated living individual in any Oscars category.
 4: Johnny Green (12)
 4: André Previn (11)
 4: John Barry (6)
 4: Alan Menken (5)
 3: Max Steiner (24)
 3: Ray Heindorf (17)
 3: Morris Stoloff (17)
 3: Miklós Rózsa (16)
 3: Dimitri Tiomkin (14)
 3: Maurice Jarre (8)
 3: Ken Darby (6)
 3: Roger Edens (6)
 3: Saul Chaplin (5)
 3: Adolph Deutsch (5)
 2: Hans Zimmer (12)
 2: Alexandre Desplat (11)
 2: Franz Waxman (11)
 2: Henry Mancini (7)
 2: Lennie Hayton (6)
 2: Michel Legrand (6)
 2: Irwin Kostal (5)
 2: Marvin Hamlisch (4)
 2: Leonard Rosenman (4)
 2: Ralph Burns (3)
 2: Howard Shore (3)
 2: Gustavo Santaolalla (2)
 2: Trent Reznor (3)
 2: Atticus Ross (3)
 1: Jerry Goldsmith (17)
 1: Victor Young (17)
 1: Herbert Stothart (11)
 1: Elmer Bernstein (10)
 1: Hugo Friedhofer (9)
 1: Lionel Newman (9)
 1: Georgie Stoll (9)
 1: James Horner (8)
 1: Leigh Harline (7)
 1: Charles Previn (7)
 1: Paul Smith (7)
 1: Dave Grusin (6)
 1: Ennio Morricone (6) Also received an Academy Honorary Award.
 1: Leslie Bricusse (5)
 1: Georges Delerue (5)
 1: Richard Hageman (5)
 1: Bernard Herrmann (5)
 1: Nelson Riddle (5)
 1: Oliver Wallace (5)
 1: Aaron Copland (4)
 1: Ernest Gold (4)
 1: Leo F. Forbstein (4)
 1: Richard M. Sherman (4)
 1: Robert B. Sherman (4)
 1: Louis Silvers (4)
 1: Frank Churchill (3)
 1: Elliot Goldenthal (3)
 1: Erich Wolfgang Korngold (3)
 1: Bronisław Kaper (3)
 1: Dario Marianelli (3)
 1: Rachel Portman (3)
 1: Stephen Schwartz (3)
 1: Harry Sukman (3)
 1: Gabriel Yared (3)
 1: John Addison (2)
 1: Luis Bacalov (2)
 1: Robert Russell Bennett (2)
 1: Hauschka (2)
 1: Jay Blackton (2)
 1: John Corigliano (2)
 1: Michael Giacchino (2)
 1: Michael Gore (2)
 1: W. Franke Harling (2)
 1: Justin Hurwitz (2)
 1: A. R. Rahman (2)
 1: Heinz Roemheld (2)
 1: Nino Rota (2)
 1: Leo Shuken (2)

The following composers have been nominated for a Best Original Score Oscar more than once but have yet to garner one. The number of nominations is listed in parentheses. These do not include nominations (or awards) in the Best Original Song category.

Deceased 

 Alex North (14) Received an Academy Honorary Award.
 Walter Scharf (9)
 Roy Webb (7)
 Werner Janssen (6)
 George Duning (5)
 Edward Ward (5)
 Edward H. Plumb (4)
 Frank De Vol (4)
 Frank Skinner (4)
 George Bruns (3)
 Richard Rodney Bennett (3)
 Louis Gruenberg (3)
 Marvin Hatley (3)
 Ernst Toch (3)
 Charles Wolcott (3)
 Daniele Amfitheatrof (2)
 Frederick Hollander (2)
 Jóhann Jóhannsson (2)
 Jack Nitzsche (2) Has won 1 Oscar Award for Original Song.
 Richard Robbins (2)
 Victor Schertzinger (2)
 Meredith Willson (2)

Living 

 Thomas Newman (14)
 Randy Newman (9) Has won 2 Oscar Awards for Original Song.
 James Newton Howard (7)
 Lalo Schifrin (5) Received an Academy Honorary Award.
 Danny Elfman (4)
 George Fenton (4)
 Alberto Iglesias (4)
 Marc Shaiman (4)
 Philip Glass (3)
 Quincy Jones (3) Has won the Jean Hersholt Humanitarian Award, a special Academy Award.
 Nicholas Britell (3)
 Carter Burwell (3) 
 Marco Beltrami (2)
 Terence Blanchard (2)
 Patrick Doyle (2)
 Jonny Greenwood (2)
 David Hirschfelder (2)

See also
 Academy Award for Best Original Song
 BAFTA Award for Best Film Music
 Critics' Choice Movie Award for Best Score
 Golden Globe Award for Best Original Score
 Grammy Award for Best Instrumental Composition
 Grammy Award for Best Pop Instrumental Performance
 Grammy Award for Best Score Soundtrack for Visual Media
 Grammy Award for Best Compilation Soundtrack for Visual Media
 Grammy Award for Best Arrangement, Instrumental or A Cappella
 Saturn Award for Best Music

References

External links
 Oscars.org (official Academy site)
 The Academy Awards Database (official site)
 Oscar.com (official ceremony promotional site)

Original Music Score
 
Film awards for best score
Awards established in 1935